Touch (sometimes mistakenly written 'Touch Records' and sometimes written Touch Music, which is technically the publishing side of the company) is a British audio-visual organisation, operating the Touch label. Touch was founded in 1982 by Jon Wozencroft and Mike Harding.

Activities
Touch Music is the main arm of the London-based multimedia publishing company Touch, established in 1982  with such composers as Oren Ambarchi, Jasmin Blasco, Christian Fennesz, Soliman Gamil,  Hildur Guðnadóttir, Philip Jeck, Phill Niblock, BJNilsen (alias Hazard), Yann Novak, Rosy Parlane, Zachary Paul, Peter Rehberg, Simon Scott, Claire M Singer, Carl Michael von Hausswolff, Chris Watson (El Tren Fantasma) and Jana Winderen on their roster.

Since January 2005 Touch's project Touch Radio has broadcast monthly programmes of varying lengths by artists including Niblock, Watson, and Jeck. In 2011 the Touch Radio archive was added to the British Library Sound Archive.

Labels
Owned labels:
 Touch
 Ash International
 Spire

References

External links
 Interview with founder Jon Wozencroft, and Michael Harding from 1992 on
 Touch - official site News, artists, catalogue, reviews, etc.
 Discography of Touch at Discogs
 Touch Radio archive at the British Library Sound Archive

British independent record labels
1982 establishments in the United Kingdom
Organizations established in 1982